There have been two Cook Baronetcies. This first was created in the Baronetage of England in 1663 and went extinct in 1708. The second was created in the Baronetage of the United Kingdom in the 19th century and is extant.

Cook baronets of Brome Hall (1663)
The Cook Baronetcy of Brome or Broome Hall was created on 29 June 1663 for Sir William Cook, 1st Baronet of Norfolk.
Sir William Cook, 1st Baronet (c.1600 – 1681)
Sir William Cook, 2nd Baronet (c.1630 – 1708), son of the former, succeeded 1681, died without issue 1708, on which the baronetcy went extinct.

Cook baronets of Doughty House, Richmond, Surrey (1886)
The Cook Baronetcy of Doughty House, in the parish of Richmond, in the County of Surrey was created on 10 March 1886 for Francis Cook. He was also the first Visconde de Monserrate (Viscount of Monserrate) in the peerage of Portugal.

Sir Francis Cook, 1st Baronet, 1st Viscount of Monserrate (28 January 1817 – 17 February 1901).
Sir Frederick Lucas Cook, 2nd Baronet, 2nd Viscount of Monserrate (21 November 1844 – 21 May 1920).
Sir Herbert Frederick Cook, 3rd Baronet, 3rd Viscount of Monserrate (18 November 1868 – 4 May 1939)
Sir Francis Ferdinand Maurice Cook, 4th Baronet, 4th Viscount of Monserrate (21 December 1907 – 12 September 1978)
Sir Christopher Wymondham Raynor Herbert Cook, 5th Baronet, 5th Viscount of Monserrate (born 24 March 1938)

See also
Doughty House

References

Sources

Extinct baronetcies in the Baronetage of England
Baronetcies in the Baronetage of the United Kingdom
Viscounts of Portugal
Richmond, London